The Cessna 187 was a light aircraft proposed by American manufacturer Cessna in the 1970s. As the newer Model 177 had been intended to replace the 172, so the 187 was intended to replace the 182.

Design
The Model 187 shape was similar to the 177, with a high cantilever wing (its design was a mix of the cantilever wings on the 177 and the 210), all-moving tailplane, and tubular main landing gear struts.  In a departure from the 177 approach, the 187's stabilator was mounted atop the vertical tail in a T-tail configuration.

Cabin doors on the 187 resembled the wide doors of the 177, and since there was no wing strut to impede its movement, the door opened to more than 90°.  The windshield was more highly sloped than that of the 182, similar to the deep slope of the 177 windshield.  The aft fuselage included a rear window with slope similar to that of the 177.  There was room for four people, and a baggage area, with a separate access door on the pilot's (left) side.  The engine was the same as the 182's engine, the Continental O-470 which delivered , with an  constant-speed propeller.

Development

Prototype stage
The program entered initial design in 1965, before the Model 177 had been officially introduced.  Construction of the first prototype began in early 1968.  Only one flying aircraft, with serial number 666 and tail number N7167C, was completed. Static test articles were also constructed, but were not tested to their full strength before the program was canceled.

First flight was on 22 April 1968.

Program cancellation
There were a few problems during flight testing, such as blanking and partial stalling of the stabilator during stalls, an empty weight greater than that of the airplane it was intended to replace, and noseheaviness.  However, the greatest obstacle to the program's acceptance was that the more complex wing's manufacturing cost would have pushed the aircraft price out of the acceptable marketing niche.  The program was therefore canceled and the prototype was destroyed that same year.

See also

References

Abandoned civil aircraft projects of the United States
187
High-wing aircraft
Single-engined tractor aircraft
1960s United States civil aircraft
T-tail aircraft
Aircraft first flown in 1968